Melanothrix leucotrigona is a moth in the family Eupterotidae. It was described by George Hampson in 1893. It is found in Myanmar, the Mergui Archipelago and Peninsular Malaysia.

References

Moths described in 1893
Eupterotinae